Conus binghamae is a species of sea snail, a marine gastropod mollusk in the family Conidae, the cone snails, cone shells or cones.

These snails are predatory and venomous. They are capable of "stinging" humans.

Description
Original description: "Shell small for genus, thin and delicate; spire low, with early whorls protracted; body whorl shiny, sculptured with fine spiral cords; spiral cords become stronger and larger around anterior one-third of body whorl; shoulder sharply-angled; aperture narrow; shell color pattern comprising darkly-colored anterior one-third and mid-body band of large square-shaped flammules; unpatterned posterior one-half of body whorl with rows of tiny dots; color varying from red, orange, apricot-yellow, to pink and bluish-purple (holotype reddish-orange with darker red-orange mid-body band and anterior tip); spire whorls with numerous crescent-shaped flammules; aperture of holotype dark red-orange; protoconch and early whorls bright yellow on all specimens, regardless of body whorl color."

The size of the shell attains 19 mm.

Distribution
Locus typicus: "(Trawled from) 200 feet depth off Dania, 
Broward County, Florida, USA."

This marine species of Cone snail occurs off Southeast Florida, 
at a depth of 61 m.

References

 Petuch, E. J. 1987. New Caribbean Molluscan Faunas. 29, plate 5, figure 1-2.
 Tucker J. T. (2013) The cone shells of Florida. An illustrated key and a review of the Recent species. 155 pp. Wellington, Florida: MdM Publishing.
 Puillandre N., Duda T.F., Meyer C., Olivera B.M. & Bouchet P. (2015). One, four or 100 genera? A new classification of the cone snails. Journal of Molluscan Studies. 81: 1-23

External links
 To World Register of Marine Species
 

binghamae
Gastropods described in 1987